Tetracha chacoensis is a species of tiger beetle that was described by Sawada & Wiesner in 1997.

References

Cicindelidae
Beetles described in 1997